A high-functioning alcoholic (HFA) is a person who maintains jobs and relationships while exhibiting alcoholism.

Many HFAs are not viewed as alcoholics by society because they do not fit the common alcoholic stereotype. Unlike the stereotypical alcoholic, HFAs have either succeeded or over-achieved throughout their lifetimes. This can lead to denial of alcoholism by the HFA, co-workers, family members, and friends. Functional alcoholics account for 19.5 percent of total U.S. alcoholics, with 50 percent also being smokers and 33 percent having a multigenerational family history of alcoholism. Statistics from the Harvard School of Public Health indicated that 31 percent of college students show signs of alcohol abuse and 6 percent are dependent on alcohol. Doctors hope that the new definition will help identify severe cases of alcoholism early, rather than when the problem is fully developed.

See also
 Holiday heart syndrome

References

Alcohol abuse
Alcohol and health